Kassay is a surname. Notable people with the surname include:

Jacob Kassay (born 1984), American artist 
John Kassay (1919–2004), American furniture expert, craftsman, draftsman, and photographer
Tilde Kassay (1887–1964), Italian actress